Vijayanagar, officially Vijayanagara is a locality in west Bangalore, India. It derives its name from the Vijayanagara empire that flourished in South India during the 15th and 16th centuries. It is bound by Mysore Road and Magadi Road, with Chord Road cutting through. It is the northernmost area in South Bangalore.

Vijay nagar TTMC is centre to Majestic as well as KSR railway station.

Location

Vijayanagar is in close proximity to R.V. College of Engineering, P.E.S. Institute of Technology, M. S. Ramaiah Institute of Technology, the Bangalore University, the National Law School of India University, Indian Institute of Fashion Technology and Dr. Ambedkar Institute of Technology.

It houses a large Public Library, which is one of the largest in Karnataka. It also boasts of a unique Karnataka Haridasa Scientific Research Centre housed in the spacious Vijaya Ranga building.

Many buses ply to different parts of Bangalore. Bus route series 61 is a direct bus from Vijayanagar to Kempegowda Bus Station/Majestic which is at a distance of around 5 kms.

Namma Metro has 3 stations on its Purple Line (Namma Metro) 

 Balagangadharanatha Swamiji Station
 provides easy access to Magadi Tollgate, Jai Muniroad circle, Vijayaganr Piple line areas
 Vijayanagara Metro Station
 provides easy access to Vijayangar, Vijayanagar 2nd Stage (Hampinagar) & Magadi Chordroad Layout (MC Layout)
 Attiguppe Metro Station
 provides easy access to Vijayanagar 2nd Stage(Hampinagar), Attiguppe, Chandra Layout, Subbanna Gargen localities

There is a well maintained Swimming pool in Vijayanagar 2nd Stage (Hampinagar)

Sub-localities
Vijayanagar East was formerly known as RPC Layout (Railway Parallel Chord Road Layout), as this locality is along the railway track. It has been recently renamed as Hampinagara, Vijayanagara 2nd Stage. Hampi was the capital of the Vijayanagara Empire.

Saraswatinagara and Govindrajnagara are two of the fastest growing localities of Vijayanagara, which houses some of the prominent people of Bengaluru. Bapujinagara, BCC Layout, Remco Layout, Attiguppe are other sub-localities.

Hospitals 
 Precision Fertility Clinic - Dr Akhila Anand
Kukke Subrahmanya Ayurvedic Clinic Clinic - Dr Poojitha Hemanth

Schools and Colleges 

 The New Cambridge School[ICSE]
 St Michael's English School
 St John's School
 NSVP covent
 Cordial schoo
 Euro kids Vijayanagar 
 St Michels Kids Kingdom Saraswathi Nagar
 Blueline school
 Pinewoods school
 St Paul school
 national English school

References

External links 

 IAS den: Vijayanagar becomes Bengaluru’s Rajendra Nagar

Neighbourhoods in Bangalore